Chauvetia recondita is a species of sea snail, a marine gastropod mollusk in the family Buccinidae, the true whelks.

Description

Distribution
This species occurs in the Mediterranean Sea off Sicily.

References

 Brugnone G. A. (1873). Miscellanea malachologica. Pars prima. Palermo, Michele Amenta, 15 pp. + 1 pl.
 Nordsieck F. (1976). Famiglia Buccinidae. Il genere Chauvetia Monterosato, 1884 nei mari d'Europa. La Conchiglia 89-90: 3-7
 Gofas, S.; Le Renard, J.; Bouchet, P. (2001). Mollusca. in: Costello, M.J. et al. (eds), European Register of Marine Species: a check-list of the marine species in Europe and a bibliography of guides to their identification. Patrimoines Naturels. 50: 180-213

External links
 Monterosato T. A. (di) (1874 (luglio)). Recherches conchyliologiques, effectuées au Cap Santo Vito, en Sicile. (Traduz. dall'italiano di H. Crosse). Journal de Conchyliologie 22 (3) : 243-282 (luglio) 22 (4)

Buccinidae
Gastropods described in 1873